The MPC-1 is a combat helmet of Yugoslavian origin manufactured from the mid-1980s by the PAP Lubljana company. The helmet is a derivative of the Israeli OR-201 but intended for Paramilitary forces.

Differences from the OR-201
The main differences between the MPC-1 and the OR-201 is that it comes with a riot visor mount and neck cover for Paramilitary forces and a different chinstrap, similar to the PČ99 helmet.

Users
 Slovenia

References

Combat helmets of Yugoslavia
Military equipment of Slovenia
Military equipment introduced in the 1980s